State Route 747 (SR 747) is a north–south state highway in the southwestern portion of the U.S. state of Ohio. SR 747 is also known as Princeton-Glendale Road.

Route description
Along its way, SR 747 passes through northern Hamilton County and southern Butler County.  No portion of SR 747 is included within the National Highway System, a system of routes deemed most important for the country's economy, mobility and defense.

History
When it was designated in 1937, SR 747 followed the same routing between SR 4 in Glendale and SR 4 near Monroe that it utilizes to this day. The highway has not experienced any major changes to its routing since it was established.

Major intersections

References

747
Transportation in Butler County, Ohio
Transportation in Hamilton County, Ohio